La Maga (Spanish feminine for "the magician") may refer to:

 Luciana Aymar (born 1977), Argentinian field hockey player
 Magaly Quintana (1952–2019), Nicaraguan feminist historian and activist
 a protagonist in the 1963 novel Hopscotch by Julio Cortázar
 a character in the Venezuelan telenovela Calypso, which debuted in 1999
 a figure in Colombian mythology - see Muelona
 La Maga, a 2015 series on Tiin, a now-defunct Mexican pay television channel

See also
 El Mago, the masculine form of the phrase

Nicknames
Lists of people by nickname